This is a record of Serbia's results at the FIFA World Cup, including as their predecessor teams Yugoslavia (1920-1992) and Serbia and Montenegro (1996-2006; the country was renamed from "Federal Republic of Yugoslavia" in 2003). FIFA recognises Serbia as the official successor of the Yugoslav teams, and thus inherits all the records of Yugoslavia. 

Including their predecessors' records, Serbia have qualified for 13 FIFA World Cup finals tournaments, last failing to do so in 2014.

FIFA World Cup record

By match

Record players

Top goalscorers

Dražan Jerković's four goals at the 1962 FIFA World Cup were enough to secure him the shared Golden Boot Award and make him the top scorer at World Cups for the SFR Yugoslavia and its successor associations.

Squads

Notes

References

 
Serbia